María Paredes may refer to:
 María Paredes (volleyball)
 María Paredes (film editor)